This is a list of anti-ship missiles.

World War II
 BHT-38 –  France
Ruhrstahl/Kramer SD 1400 X (Fritz X) —  Nazi Germany
 Henschel Hs 293 —  Nazi Germany
 Henschel Hs 294 —  Nazi Germany
 Blohm & Voss BV 143 —  Nazi Germany (prototype)
 Blohm + Voss BV 246 (Hagelkorn) —  Nazi Germany (prototype)
 Igo –  Empire of Japan
 Ohka piloted suicide missile –  Empire of Japan
 Bat –  United States Used in combat only once.

Asia

India 
BrahMos – Supersonic cruise missile (range of 650 km) jointly developed by India and Russia.
Nirbhay – Anti-ship cruise missile with the range of 1000 km to 1500 km at the speed of 0.7 to 0.9 mach.(under development)
BrahMos-NG  – Miniaturized version of the Brahmos. (under development)
BrahMos-II  - Mach 7 Hypersonic cruise missile (range of 1000 km). (under development)
Dhanush – A system consisting of stabilization platform and missiles, which has the capability to launch
Agni-P  - May be developed into Anti-ship ballistic missile and "carrier killer" .
NASM-SR – DRDO Naval Anti-Ship Missile Short Range (Range 55+ km) for Helicopter. (Under development)

Indonesia 
RN01-SS, anti-ship and land attack missile, currently under development.

Iran 
Ra'ad – Indigenously developed long-range anti-ship missile based on HY-2 Silkworm.
Noor – upgraded copy of Chinese C-802.
Tondar – upgraded copy of Chinese C-801. Similar to Noor but powered by solid rocket booster and range of 50 km.
Thaqeb – Similar to Noor, modified for submarine launch.
Nasr – Several versions based on TL-6, C-704 and C-705.
Kowsar 1/2/3 – Several versions based on Chinese C-701, TL-10 and C-704.
Fajre Darya – copy of Sea Killer II.
Zafar (anti-ship missile)
Persian Gulf (Khalij Fars) – Anti ship ballistic missile based on Fateh-110.
Qader – Iranian anti-ship cruise missile with a range over 200 km.
Ghader (missile)

Iraq 
Al Salah-Ad-Din

Israel 
Gabriel (missile)-made by Israel Aircraft Industries (IAI)
Luz (missile)
 Naval Spike
 Sea Breaker

Japan 
Type 80 Air-to-Ship Missile (ASM-1)
Type 88 Surface-to-Ship Missile (SSM-1)
Type 90 Ship-to-Ship Missile (SSM-1B)
Type 91 Air-to-Ship Missile (ASM-1C)
Type 93 Air-to-Ship Missile (ASM-2)
Type 12 Surface-to-Ship Missile
XASM-3

North Korea 

Kh-35 KN-09 (KN-09), KN-19 Kumsong 3 / Geumsong (Venus) land & coastal
P-15 KN-1 Ks1 Gs1
Silkworm KN-1 
P-15 Termit KN-1
P-35 GeumSeong 2
Silkworm (missile)
C-802
C-602

Pakistan 
Zarb – Subsonic anti-ship cruise missile
Hatf-VIII (Ra'ad) – Air-launched anti-ship cruise missile
Babur – land-attack cruise missile capable of anti-ship roles
Harbah missile — Anti-ship cruise missile with land attack capability

People's Republic of China 
 SY-1 (SS-N-2 Styx) – Shang You 1 is a Chinese copy of the Soviet P-15 Styx ship-to-ship missile, initially produced in the 1960s under license with Soviet-supplied kits.  After the Sino-Soviet Split, production resumed with Chinese-made components. 
 SY-1A – Improved SY-1 missile with mono-pulse terminal guidance radar
 SY-2 (CSS-N-5 Sabot) – Also known as Fei Long 2, radar-guided ship-to-ship missile produced in the 1990s as replacement for the SY-1.  Similar to SY-1 in size, the SY-2 can be launched from existing SY-1 launchers.  
 SY-2A – Extended-range version of the SY-2 with new turbojet engine and GPS guidance, can be deployed from air as air-launched anti-ship missile.
 SY-2B – Improved SY-2A anti-ship missile with supersonic speed and low-level flight.
 FL-7 – Land-to-ship version of SY-2, for export only
 HY-1 (CSS-N-1 & CSS-N-2 Silkworm) – The Hai Ying 1 isn extended range anti-ship missile based on the SY-1 design. 
 HY-1J – Ship-to-ship version of HY-1 missile
 HY-1JA – Improved HY-1J with new radar and better ECM and range
 HY-1A – Land-to-ship version of HY-1JA
 HY-1B – Target drone for HQ-2A SAM
 HJ-1YB – Target drone for HQ-61 SAM
 YJ-1 – Also known as the C-101, a ramjet powered upgrade to the HY-1.  The YJ-1 never entered production, but the engine was used in HY-3.
Silkworm missile
 HY-2 (CSS-C-3 Seersucker) – Also known as the C-201, the Hai Ying 2 is a land-to-ship missile developed from the HY-1.  Generally considered obsolete, no ship-to-ship version was built.
 HY-2A – IR-guided version of HY-2
 HY-2AII – Improved version of HY-2A
 HY-2B – Improved HY-2 with mono-pulse radar seeker
 HY-2BII – Improved HY-2B with new radar seeker
 C-201W – Extended-range version of HY-2 with turbojet engine, for export only.
 HY-3 (CSS-C-6 Sawhorse) – Also known as C-301, the HY-3 is an active radar-homing land-to-ship missile with ramjet engine.  Developed in 1980s based on HY-2 and YJ-1 technology. 
 HY-4 (CSS-C-7 Sadsack) – Turbojet powered version of HY-2, the HY-4 is a land-to-ship missile with mono-pulse radar. 
 XW-41 – Air-launched land-attack version of HY-4 under development.
 YJ-6 (CAS-1 Kraken) – Also known as the C-601 air-launched anti-ship missile, developed from HY-2 in 1980s 
 TL-6 – Anti-ship missile designed to engage naval vessel with displacement up to 1,000 tons.
 TL-10 – Light weight fire and forgot anti-ship missile designed to engage naval vessel with displacement up to 800 tons.
 YJ-62 – The Yingji 62 is a long-range (400 km) subsonic anti-ship cruise missile 
 YJ-7 – also known as the C-701, the Ying Ji 7 is a lightweight anti-ship missile developed in the 1990s.  This missile can be launched from land, air, or sea, with TV, IR image, and millimetre radar guidance.  However this is a light anti-ship missile with only 29 kg warhead and 15–20 km range, it was not accepted into service by the PLAN for anti-shipping roles, but instead, it is generally used as an air-to-surface missile instead. 
 C-704 – Anti-ship missile designed to engage ships with displacement between 1,000 tons to 4,000 tons
 C-705
 C-801
 C-802 (CSS-N-4 Sardine) – The Yingji 8 series anti-ship missiles is also known as the C-80X.  Unlike previous missiles, the YJ-8 series is developed based on western design concepts, rather than the original Soviet Styx.  The YJ-8 is more similar to the French-made Exocet Anti-ship missile.   The YJ-8 can be launched from sea, land, air, and even submarines. 
 YJ-8A (C-801A) – YJ-82 with folded wings
 YJ-8K (C-801K) – Air-launched version of YJ-8 anti-ship missile 
 YJ-8Q (C-801Q) – Submarine-launched version of YJ-8
 YJ-82 (CSS-N-8 Saccade) – Also known as C-802, extended range (120 km) land-to-ship missile
 YJ-82A (C-802A) – Improved YJ-82 showcased at DSEI in 2005, with published range of 180 km.
YJ-82K (C-802K) – Air-launched version of YJ-82 
YJ-83 (C-803) – Extended range supersonic version of YJ-82 developed in the mid 1990s
 YJ-83K (C-803K) – Air-launched version of YJ-83
 YJ-85 (C-805) – Land-attack cruise missile (LACM) version under development
 YJ-12
 YJ-18
 YJ-100
 DH-10 – Cruise missile able to carry a wide range of warheads, including nuclear and EMP weapons.
 YJ-91
 HN-1 – Hong Niao-1 cruise missile
 HN-2 – Hong Niao-2 cruise missile
 HN-3 – Hong Niao-3 cruise missile
 HN-2000 - Hong Niao-2000 cruise missile
 CX-1 Missile Systems
 CJ-1 ASM

Republic of China - Taiwan 
 Hsiung Feng I – Brave Wind I is a subsonic ship-to-ship developed by CIST in the 1970s, said to be based on the Israeli Gabriel missile.
 Hsiung Feng II – Brave Wind II is a subsonic missile with ship-to-ship, surface-to-ship, and air-to-ship versions. It is not an improved version of HF-I, but rather a new design.
 Hsiung Feng III – Brave Wind III is a state of the art supersonic (Mach 2-3) long range nuclear weapons capable scramjet ship-to-ship missile developed by CIST.

South Korea 
SSM-700K Haeseong

Turkey 
 Atmaca – Atmaca is a long-range, all-weather, precision strike, anti-ship cruise missile developed by the Turkish company ROKETSAN
 SOM - SOM is a modern, autonomous, low observable, high precision air-launched cruise missile along with anti-ship capability.

Europe

Joint development 

 Kormoran 2 – Germany/France; Used on Tornado IDS (INS and radar guidance)
 IDAS – Germany/Norway/Turkey; Made by Diehl/HDW/Kongsberg/Nammo/ROKETSAN (submarine-launched missile, also against air and land targets)
 Teseo/Otomat/Milas – originally Italian/French; Made by Otomelara, now joint European; Made by MBDA
 Martel – United Kingdom/France; Made by BAe/Matra (radar and video guidance variants)
 Perseus – A new missile being developed by MBDA for the Royal Navy and French Navy
 Rb 08 – Sweden/France; Made by Saab
 RBS-15 Mk. III – originally Sweden; Made by Saab Bofors Dynamics, now joint Germany-Sweden, also produced by Diehl BGT Defence (also used land-attack missile)

France 
 Exocet – France; Made by Aérospatiale, now MBDA
Exocet MM38 surface-launched
 Exocet AM39 air-launched
 Exocet SM39 submarine-launched
 Exocet MM40 surface-launched
ANL (Anti-Navire Léger) – France; Anti-ship missile under development
ARMAT – France; Made by Matra
AS.12 – France; Built by Aérospatiale/Nord Aviation (visual guidance, wire controlled SACLOS)
AS.15 – France; Built by Aérospatiale
Malafon – France; Made by Latécoère
Malaface – France; Made by Latécoère
MMP – France; Made by MBDA

Italy 

Sea Killer/Marte – Italy; Made by MBDA

Norway 

AGM-119 Penguin – Norway; Made by Kongsberg Defence & Aerospace (KDA) (infrared homing) 
Naval Strike Missile (NSM) – Norway; Made by KDA (imaging infrared)

Serbia 

ALAS (missile)

Sweden 

RBS15; made by Saab Bofors Dynamics, now also joint Germany-Sweden, made by Diehl BGT Defence 
RB 04; made by Saab AB (historical use)

Ukraine
R-360 Neptune

United Kingdom 

Sea Eagle – United Kingdom; Made by BAe 
Sea Skua – United Kingdom; Made by BAe
SPEAR 3 – United Kingdom; Made by MBDA

USSR / Russian Federation 

(Listed by official Soviet/Russian name, followed by GRAU designation and NATO reporting name in parentheses.)

10Kh 14KhK1 14Kh 18Kh 15kh 17kh
KSShch
KS-1 Komet
K-10S
KSR-5
P-1 (GRAU: 4K32, NATO: SS-N-1 Scrubber)
P-5 (GRAU: 4K34, NATO: SS-N-3 Sepal/Shaddock)
P-15 Termit (GRAU: 4K40, NATO: SS-N-2 Styx)
P-70 Ametist (GRAU: 4K66, NATO: SS-N-7 Starbright)
P-80 Zubr (NATO: SS-N-22 Sunburn)
P-120 Malakhit (GRAU: 4K85, NATO: SS-N-9 Siren)
P-270 Moskit (GRAU: 3M80, NATO: SS-N-22 Sunburn)
P-500 Bazalt (GRAU: 4K80, NATO: SS-N-12 Sandbox)
P-700 Granit (GRAU: 3M45, NATO: SS-N-19 Shipwreck)
Kh-22
Kh-31A
Kh-35 (GRAU 3M24, SS-N-25 Switchblade)
Kh-59 (antinaval AShM variants)
P-750 Grom (GRAU: 3M25, NATO: SS-N-24 Scorpion, Kh-80)
P-800 Oniks (GRAU: 3M55, NATO: SS-NX-26 Oniks/Yakhont)
K-300P Bastion-P
PJ-10 BrahMos – Supersonic cruise missile (range of 290 km) jointly developed by India and Russia from SS-NX-26.
P-900 (GRAU: 3M51, NATO: SS-N-27 Club) (ASW, ASuW and land-attack versions) 
P-900 Alfa
P-1000 Vulkan (GRAU: 3M70, NATO: SS-N-12 Mod 2 Sandbox)
Raduga Kh-15 (NATO: AS-16 Kickback)
RPK-2 Viyuga (NATO: SS-N-15 Starfish) (ASW)
RPK-3 Metel (NATO: SS-N-14 Silex) (ASW with ASuW mode)
RPK-6 Vodopad (NATO: SS-N-16 Stallion) (ASW)
RPK-7 Vorobei (NATO: SS-N-16 Stallion) (ASW)
RPK-9 Medvedka (NATO: SS-N-29) (ASW) 
3M-54 Klub (NATO: SS-N-27A Sizzler)
BrahMos-II
Zircon (missile) 
Kh-47M2 Kinzhal

North America

United States

(All missiles based on radar homing unless otherwise noted.)
AGM/RGM/UGM-84 Harpoon missile – United States; Made by Boeing/McDonnell Douglas
AGM-84H/K SLAM-ER (Standoff Land Attack Missile - Expanded Response) – United States; Made by Boeing/McDonnell Douglas
AGM-123 Skipper – United States; Developed by the U.S. Navy
BGM-109 Tomahawk (TASM version) & Block Va (Maritime Strike Tomahawk) - United States; Made by Raytheon/General Dynamics
RIM-67 Standard – U.S, Raytheon (secondary role, SARH, no longer deployed)
RIM-174 Standard ERAM/SM-6 – U.S., Raytheon (secondary role)
AGM-158C LRASM Currently under development by Lockheed Martin for DARPA.

South America

Argentina 
AS-25K
MP-1000 Martín Pescador

Brazil 
MANSUP

References

Lists of weapons